Mount Roraima is the highest of the Pakaraima chain of tepuis (table-top mountain) or plateaux in South America. It is located at the junction of Venezuela, Brazil and Guyana. A characteristic large flat-topped mountain surrounded by cliffs 400 to 1,000 meters high. The highest point of Mount Roraima is located on the southern edge of the cliff at an altitude of 2,810 meters in Venezuela, and another protrusion at an altitude of 2,772 meters at the junction of the three countries in the north of the plateau is the highest point in Guyana. The name of Mount Roraima came from the native Pemon people. Roroi in the Pemon language means "blue-green", and ma means "great".

Leaching caused by intense rainfall has shaped the peculiar topography of the summit, and the geographical isolation of Mount Roraima has made it home to much endemic flora and fauna. Western exploration of Mount Roraima did not begin until the 19th century, when it was first climbed by a British expedition in 1884. Yet despite subsequent expeditions, its flora and geology remain largely unknown. The privileged setting and relatively easy access and climbing conditions on the south side of the cliffs make Mount Roraima one of the most popular destinations for hikers.

Geography
Mount Roraima is located in the northern part of South America, the Pacarema Mountains in the eastern part of the Guyana Plateau, Brazil in the east accounting for 5% of its area, Guyana in the north accounting for 10%, and Venezuela in the south and west accounting for 85%. Access to Mount Roraima from the Venezuelan side is close to the road and relatively easy; however, for both Brazil and Guyana the area is completely isolated and can only be reached by a few days of forest hikes or small local airstrip.

Mount Roraima is a flat-topped mountain, typical of the Guyana Shield, with an elevation of about 1,200 meters in the southeast and only about 600 meters in the northwest. The south, southeast, east, northeast and northwest faces are all formed by straight cliffs up to about 1,000 meters high. At the southern end of the mountain, part of the cliff has collapsed, forming a spectacular natural boulder. The base of the cliff is surrounded by steep slopes to the south and east, and the north and west sides form river valleys leading to the summit.

The top of Mount Roraima has a length of more than 10 kilometers, a maximum width of 5 kilometers, an area of ​​about 33 to 50 square kilometers, an altitude of more than 2200 meters, and an average altitude of 2600–2700 meters. The plateau is a pseudo-karst surface etched by heavy rainfall. The highest point is 2810 meters above sea level, located at the southern end of the plateau and the highest point in the state of Bolivar, 8.25 kilometers north of the summit is another high point with an altitude of 2,772 meters, which is the highest point in Guyana. In the northern part of the plateau is the landmark of the border between Brazil, Venezuela and Guyana, with an altitude of 2734 meters.

Due to its high altitude and proximity to the equator, Mount Roraima has a constant average annual temperature between 20 and 22 °C and annual rainfall of more than 1,500 mm, with 1,800 to 3,000 mm in parts of the rainy season from April to November. The climatic conditions at the top of the mountain differ significantly from its base, the high cloudiness in the region is associated with the prevailing northeasterly and southeasterly winds, and the relative humidity of the air remains between 75% and 85%.

Geology
Mount Roraima is composed of Proterozoic age sandstone formed about 1.7 to 2 billion years ago, and hence amongst the oldest rocks on Earth and contains a large amount of quartz deposits, 98% are silica particles, forming white or pink crystals several centimeters long. These rocks sit on a granite and gneiss base and were originally covered by layers of Mesozoic clay, conglomerate, and diorite, but have been exposed by erosion and by orogeny over the past 180 million years, eroded by precipitation to form strange shapes. The soil of the sandstone matrix is highly acidic, poor in nutrients, and very fine. Intense rainfall prevents the fixation of nutrients and particles, thereby preventing the formation of hilltop vegetation and soil.

The numerous caves and rifts in the interior of the plateau make Mount Roraima exhibit a pseudokarst structure, and these caves form a network over 15 kilometers long with a total height difference of 73.21 meters, It is the largest quartz cave in the world. These caves are formed by the infiltration of surface water, so the water level inside them depends largely on the precipitation on the surface of the plateau: prolonged drought can dry up waterways, and dry caves can also become underground rivers. The water that poured into it rushed into the crevices of the rock and flowed out in the form of waterfalls on the mountainside, creating many streams at the foot of the mountain.

Ecology
Due to the late exploration of this part of South America and the discovery of new species every year, the flora and fauna here are largely unknown. The currently identified species are strongly endemic, especially the fauna, which also puts them at a high risk of extinction. The bottom of the cliff at the foot of the mountain is an evergreen rainforest composed of trees 25 to 45 meters high, and some can reach 60 meters. Vegetation is dominated by Arecaceae and Astragalus. The soils on the cliffs are more sandy, the climate is cooler, and the vegetation consists of bromeliads very similar to the Andes. The vegetation on the plateau is still largely unknown and consists mainly of bare rocks, forests of trees and epiphytes , and wet and dry savannas in the form of swamps. It is marked by numerous endemic species, especially carnivorous plants that capture insects and find them there in sandstone and leaching soils without the nitrates necessary for their development. There are fewer species in the vicinity of streams and ravines, and the trees are 8 to 15 meters tall and have hard leaves that can adapt to harsh environmental conditions. The exposed rocks are occupied by lichens, algae and cyanobacteria.

The fauna at the foot of the mountain is composed of a variety of mammals, and this huge diversity is particularly prominent in the Amazon rainforest, such as sloths, anteaters, tapirs, armadillos, capybaras, possums, agouti, prairie fox, weasels, raccoons, deer, cougars, and primates such as howler monkeys and capuchins. There are hundreds of species of birds, the most common of which are falcons, parrots, owls, etc. Some hummingbirds are endemic to the region. Due to low mobility relative to other species, reptiles and amphibians show large differences between individuals found at the bottom and top of Mount Roraima. While species inhabiting forests at the foot of the plateau are common, such as green iguanas, pit vipers, coral snakes and pythons, those found at the top are even rarer. Cave fauna consists of many species of bats, grasshoppers, spiders and centipedes, but this fragile subterranean ecosystem is being disturbed by surface hikers, organic matter produced by tourists and explorers over the years. Pollutants such as fuel are washed into the ground by rainwater, which leads to the proliferation of microorganisms and causes ecological imbalance.

Exploration
European discovery was in 1595, during a Spanish and British race to colonize this part of South America, although Mount Roraima had been inhabited by Amerindians for at least 10,000 years. The English poet, army officer and explorer Walter Raleigh described it as an immeasurable "Crystal Mountain" gushing out of countless waterfalls. The first expedition to Mount Roraima took place in 1838, when German scientist and explorer Robert Hermann Schomburgk observed it during a Royal Geographical Society-funded expedition to explore British Guiana (1835-39). In 1840, the British government commissioned him to establish the boundaries between British Guiana and Venezuela. When he returned to the area in 1844 to study the local flora, he reported that the peak seemed inaccessible due to its towering cliffs. In 1864, German naturalist and botanist Carl Ferdinand Appun and British geologist Charles Barrington Brown arrived at the southeastern tip of Mount Roraima for observation and proposed to go up the mountain by hot air balloon.

Although its vertical cliffs make access very difficult, Mount Roraima was the first large mesa to be climbed in the Guyana Plateau. Henry Whiteley, who studied the birds of the area, observed that the summit could be reached from the south with the help of ropes and ladders. Everard im Thurn and Harry Perkins led an expedition sponsored by the Royal Geographical Society that culminated on December 18, 1884, when the team found even a local Aboriginal Pemon. Passages unknown to man, they indicate that the top of the cliff has been unknown since the dawn of man. Soon, many expeditions made up of botanists, zoologists and geologists made multiple expeditions to Mount Roraima to study the mostly unknown flora and fauna and special geological conditions of the area.

Climbing
Mount Roraima and Mount Aoyan are the only flat-topped mountains in the Canaima National Park that can be climbed by hikers, with a monthly quota of 200 people. Its ascent takes three to five days in total, the summit route is on a natural slope on the southwestern cliffs of Mount Roraima, it does not require any special equipment or training, so it is chosen by almost all hikers, the only difficulty is that some streams and small waterfalls may become difficult to pass under heavy rain. However, the length of the trail requires climbers to spend one night at the base camp at the foot of the cliff at an altitude of about 2,000 meters, and another night at the summit, taking several days to explore the plateau and two days to descend. The best time to climb Mount Roraima is in the dry season, however, when the sun is very strong and the temperature is high, it can make the road to the mountain difficult.

Gallery

Notes

References

Further reading

 Aubrecht, R., T. Lánczos, M. Gregor, J. Schlögl, B. Šmída, P. Liščák, C. Brewer-Carías & L. Vlček (15 September 2011). Sandstone caves on Venezuelan tepuis: return to pseudokarst? Geomorphology 132(3–4): 351–365. 
 Aubrecht, R., T. Lánczos, M. Gregor, J. Schlögl, B. Šmída, P. Liščák, C. Brewer-Carías & L. Vlček (2013). Reply to the comment on "Sandstone caves on Venezuelan tepuis: return to pseudokarst?". Geomorphology, published online on 30 November 2012. 
  Brewer-Carías, C. (2012).  Río Verde 8: 77–94.
 Jaffe, K., J. Lattke & R. Perez-Hernández (January–June 1993). Ants on the tepuies of the Guiana Shield: a zoogeographic study. Ecotropicos 6(1): 21–28.
 Kok, P.J.R., R.D. MacCulloch, D.B. Means, K. Roelants, I. Van Bocxlaer & F. Bossuyt (7 August 2012).  Current Biology 22(15): R589–R590.  []
 MacCulloch, R.D., A. Lathrop, R.P. Reynolds, J.C. Senaris and G.E. Schneider. (2007). Herpetofauna of Mount Roraima, Guiana Shield region, northeastern South America. Herpetological Review 38: 24-30.
 Sauro, F., L. Piccini, M. Mecchia & J. De Waele (2013). Comment on "Sandstone caves on Venezuelan tepuis: return to pseudokarst?" by R. Aubrecht, T. Lánczos, M. Gregor, J. Schlögl, B. Smída, P. Liscák, Ch. Brewer-Carías, L. Vlcek, Geomorphology 132 (2011), 351–365. Geomorphology, published online on 29 November 2012. 
Warren, A. (1973). Roraima: report of the 1970 British expedition to Mount Roraima in Guyana, South America. Seacourt Press, Oxford UK, 152 pp.
 Zahl, Paul, A. (1940) To the Lost World. George G. Harrap & Co. Ltd. 182 High Holborn, London, W.C.1

External links

 Mount Roraima Information
 Mount Roraima on SummitPost.org
 National Geographic's 2004 Biological Exploration of the Cliffs
 Dias de Tempestade (Days of Storm) - 28-minute short documentary on Vimeo (in Portuguese, with English subtitles) showing the 2010 climb of Mount Roraima from the Guyana side by Brazilian climber Eliseu Frechou and his team.
 Mount Roraima Guide
  Mount Roraima Information 2022

Mount Roraima
Tepuis of Brazil
Tepuis of Guyana
Tepuis of Venezuela
Mount Roraima
International mountains of South America
Highest points of Brazilian states
Highest points of countries
Mount Roraima
Mount Roraima
Mount Roraima
Mount Roraima
Mount Roraima
Climbing areas of Venezuela
Climbing areas of Brazil